Linda Kaufman Kerber (born January 23, 1940, in Brooklyn, New York) is an American feminist, a political and intellectual historian, and educator who specializes in the history and development of the democratic mind in America, and the history of women in America.

Early life and education
The daughter of Harry Hagman and Dorothy Haber Kaufman, Kerber graduated from Forest Hills High School in Queens, New York, and married Richard Kerber in 1960. She received a BA from Barnard College (1960), an MA from New York University (1961), and her PhD from Columbia University (1968) under the supervision of Richard Hofstadter.

Career
Kerber joined the faculty at the University of Iowa in 1971, and is currently the May Brodbeck Professor in Liberal Arts & Sciences, and also lecturer in the College of Law.

Kerber published her first book, Federalists in Dissent: Imagery and Ideology in Jeffersonian America, in 1970. One of the first historians to interpret the history of the early United through the lens of women's history, she published Women of the Republic: Intellect and Ideology in Revolutionary America in 1980. In this path breaking book, Kerber introduced the concept of "Republican Motherhood."

In 1998, Kerber published No Constitutional Right to be Ladies: Women and the Obligations of Citizenship, a political history of women and the law that spans the history of the United States from the early Republic to the late twentieth century. She also published essays and books on the feminism and history and on women's intellectual history.

From the beginning of her career, inspired by the women's movement, Kerber played an active role in enhancing the status of women in the historical profession. An early member of the Berkshire Conference of Women Historians, she began to attend meetings of the newly formed Coordinating Committee for Women in the Historical Profession. In the early 1970s, when the American Historical Association appointed a Committee on Women Historians to provide recommendations as to how to improve the professional positions of women, she was among its first members and also served as its chair.
 
Kerber served as the president of the American Studies Association in 1988, the Organization of American Historians in 1996–97, and the American Historical Association in 2006.  She was the Harold Vyvyan Harmsworth Visiting Professor of American History at Oxford University in 2006–2007, delivering the Harold Vyvyan Harmsworth Memorial Lecture at Oxford on November 16, 2006.

She has received fellowships from, among others, the National Endowment for the Humanities three times, the National Humanities Center, the John Simon Guggenheim Memorial Foundation, and the Radcliffe Institute for Advanced Study.  She is an elected member and serves on the Council of the American Philosophical Society, a fellow of the American Academy of Arts and Sciences, and a Fellow of the Rothermere American Institute, University of Oxford. Kerber serves on the international advisory board of the feminist academic journal Signs.

Works
 Federalists in Dissent: Imagery and Ideology in Jeffersonian America (Cornell University Press, 1970, pbk reprint, 1980) read online
 Women of the Republic: Intellect and Ideology in Revolutionary America (University of North Carolina Press for Institute for Early American History and Culture, 1980, and later paperback reprints) read online
 Women's America: Refocusing the Past (with Jane Sherron De Hart) (Oxford University Press, 1995; 6th ed. 2004)  read online
 U.S. History as Women's History: New Feminist Essays (University of Carolina Press, 1995) (with Alice Kessler-Harris and Kathryn Kish Sklar) read online
Toward an Intellectual History of Women: Essays by Linda K. Kerber (University of North Carolina Press, 1997) read online
No Constitutional Right to be Ladies: Women and the Obligations of Citizenship (New York: Hill and Wang, a division of Farrar, Straus & Giroux, 1998 and pbk reprint)  read online  Received two prizes from the American Historical Association: the Littleton-Griswold Prize  for the best book in U.S. legal history, and the Joan Kelly Memorial Prize  for the best book in women's history.

References

External links
Linda Kerber Department of History, University of Iowa

1940 births
Living people
American women historians
Barnard College alumni
Columbia University alumni
Presidents of the American Historical Association
University of Iowa faculty
Harold Vyvyan Harmsworth Professors of American History
Women's historians
Feminist historians
Members of the American Philosophical Society
Fellows of the American Academy of Arts and Sciences
21st-century American women